Spring Grove Borough Historic District is a national historic district located at Spring Grove Borough in York County, Pennsylvania. The district includes 199 contributing buildings in the central business district and surround residential areas of the paper mill borough of Spring Grove. Most of the buildings date between 1880 and 1900, and include notable examples of the Queen Anne, Georgian Revival, and Italianate styles.

It was listed on the National Register of Historic Places in 1984.

References 

Historic districts on the National Register of Historic Places in Pennsylvania
Italianate architecture in Pennsylvania
Queen Anne architecture in Pennsylvania
Historic districts in York County, Pennsylvania
National Register of Historic Places in York County, Pennsylvania